Bonnie Patricia Morgan is a female contortionist and actress.

Early life
Morgan was born to actor Gary Morgan and grew up in a family of circus performers. She has a sister, Molly, who is also an actress. She is a professional body manipulator, and has performed as a clown and studied as a classical actor.

Career
Becoming a professional contortionist, Morgan has appeared in many known movies such as Piranha 3D, Minority Report, Fright Night and has made an appearance as Beth in the short film Sorority Pillow Fight (alongside Michelle Rodriguez). She also provided stunts in Hellboy II: The Golden Army, for which she was nominated for Screen Actors Guild Award for Outstanding Performance by a Stunt Ensemble in a Motion Picture, and in the William Brent Bell's documentary-style horror film The Devil Inside. She acted as well in several commercial spots and holds a record registered in the Guinness World Records having spent around three minutes with two other people in a box of two by two foot.

Morgan is also known for her role as Samara Morgan, the antagonist of The Ring franchise, portraying the role in Rings and in stunts for The Ring Two.

In 2018, Morgan guest starred as a contortionist and henchwoman named Colette in the Netflix Original Series, A Series of Unfortunate Events. She returned to the role for the series' third and final season the following year.

Filmography

Film

Television

References

External links 

 

Living people
Year of birth missing (living people)
Contortionists